The Abadal was a Spanish car manufactured between 1912 and 1923, named after Francisco Abadal. Considered a fast luxury car, it was closely patterned on the Hispano-Suiza and offered in two models. One had a 3104 cc four-cylinder engine while the other had a 4521 cc six-cylinder engine.

Soon after the inception of the Abadal line, the Belgian company Impéria began building Abadals under license as Impéria-Abadal. In 1916 Abadal acquired the Buick agency, and Barcelona-built Abadals after that year had Buick power units and featured custom coachwork. These cars were called Abadal-Buick. M.A. Van Roggen (formerly of Springuel) took over the Belgian operation soon after, and built around 170 more Impéria-Abadals. Among the models produced were a 2992cc 16-valve four-cylinder OHC sports model and three prototype 5630 cc straight-eights. The company ceased automobile production in 1923.

Francisco Abadal (nicknamed Paco) was a Hispano-Suiza salesman and racing driver in Barcelona. He began this enterprise in 1912, and upon its cessation became an agent of General Motors in Spain. General Motors' plans in 1930 related to a prototype named the Abadal Continental never materialised.

Gallery

Abadal Y-12 aero-engine
Abadal also produced the Abadal Y-12 aero-engine, a multiple bank in-line engine with twelve cylinders in three banks of four arranged in a Y.

References

Defunct motor vehicle manufacturers of Spain
Vintage vehicles
Companies based in Barcelona